The blue-eared lory (Eos semilarvata) (also known as Ceram lory, half-masked lory or Seram lory) is a parrot found only on the island of Seram in Maluku province, Indonesia.

The blue-eared lory is the smallest Eos at 24 cm long. It has a red body with blue cheeks, chin, and ear-coverts, purple-blue abdomen and undertail coverts, and black streaked wings. The adult has an orange beak with juvenile's pink.

The blue-eared lory is sometimes found in the altitude as low as 800 m, but primarily from 1600–2400 m. It feeds on flowering trees, including tree-heathers above the tree-line. The flocks are small.

A common species in its limited range, the blue-eared lory is evaluated as Least Concern on the IUCN Red List of Threatened Species.

References

Juniper & Parr (1998) Parrots: A Guide to Parrots of the World; .

External links 
 Oriental Bird Images: Blue-eared Lory

blue-eared lory
Birds of Seram
blue-eared lory
blue-eared lory